Bougainville languages may refer to either of the following language families of Bougainville Island, Papua New Guinea.

North Bougainville languages
South Bougainville languages